The Park Place station is a station on the  BMT Franklin Avenue Line of the New York City Subway in Crown Heights, Brooklyn. Served by the Franklin Avenue Shuttle at all times, it is the only solitary station in the subway system to be served solely by a shuttle service without any connections to non-shuttle services. It is also the only single-track station in the subway system that is not a terminal station.

History 

The station is located at the point where the tracks of the original Brooklyn, Flatbush & Coney Island Railway left the street surface and began running in an open-cut right-of-way on its route to Brighton Beach and Coney Island. The Kings County Elevated Railway (KCER) had begun serving the line in 1896.

A station was established at this spot on June 19, 1899 to provide local residents access to KCER trains. This station consisted of two simple compacted earth platforms at the side of each track running south of Park Place.

During 1905–1906, this portion of the line was rebuilt as a raised elevated railway and embankment structure, and a new station was built at this location, with a single floor-level island platform and a station house between the tracks. The new station was located with the station house over Park Place and the platform extending north from that point.

The station deteriorated over the years as the New York City Transit Authority considered whether to abandon or rehabilitate the station and the line. Community support in the Bedford–Stuyvesant and Crown Heights communities persuaded the city to rebuild the line. The station closed in 1998, was completely rebuilt, and reopened in 1999.

Station layout

The rebuilt 1999 station consists of a single side platform and a single track serving trains traveling in both directions. The new, wider, station platform was built partly over the former southbound track. The large station house is built in a style reminiscent of station houses built in the World War I era on the BMT Brighton Line such as Parkside Avenue and a number of stations on the BMT Sea Beach Line.

Exit
The station has a turnstile bank, token booth, a short staircase on the south side going down to the north side of Park Place, and a long ADA-accessible ramp and staircase going to the south side of Prospect Place on the north side of the station house.

References

External links 

 
 Station Reporter — Franklin Shuttle
 The Subway Nut — Park Place Pictures 
 MTA's Arts For Transit — Park Place (BMT Franklin Avenue Line)
 Station house entrance as seen from Park Place
 Park Place entrance from Google Maps Street View
 Prospect Place entrance from Google Maps Street View
 Platform from Google Maps Street View

BMT Franklin Avenue Shuttle stations
New York City Subway stations in Brooklyn
Railway stations in the United States opened in 1899
Crown Heights, Brooklyn
1899 establishments in New York City